The Hungarian Reform Era was a period of Hungarian history which led to the awakening of the Hungarian national identity after 150 years of Ottoman and 300 years of Habsburg rule. Its beginning was marked by the reconvening of the Diet of Hungary of 1825 and the foundation of the Hungarian Academy of Sciences. The era ended with the 1848 revolution and the ensuing Hungarian War of Independence.

Antecedents and main issues 
Francis I was a conservative absolutist monarch. He reigned by intimidation and he had an informer network too. At that time, Hungary was really far behind the Czech and Austrian provinces in development: the country relied on the agricultural production (therefore the industry wasn’t really developed) and the guild system, which strict regulations prevented the development of the industry and the trade. The revolutionary wave which swept through Europe brought two new ideas to Hungary too: nationalism and liberalism.

But what did they want? They wanted to convert the old and outdated feudal economy and society to a new and modern one. The solution was brought by the deepening crisis of the feudal system, in which the nobility had to make some changes in their situation, therefore they saw the way out of this crisis with the introduction of embourgeoisement.

In István Széchenyi’s work, Credit, he raises the idea of the abolition of antiquity and the elimination of robotic systems, because he realized that the agriculture wouldn’t develop and the land sales wouldn’t grow, if they keep these restrictions, because the people can’t get credit to their lands (the book received its name from that).

The Reform Diets 
1825–27

After many years, a Diet was convened in Pozsony in 1825. The reason why it was convened is that there were some international problems in 1820. The king, Francis I promised to return to the feudal constitution, but in exchange the nobility had to increase the tax and rookie headcount. This diet weren’t a Reform Diet, but this was the first one in which some progress were made: they had to convene the parliament/diet every 3 years and István Széchenyi offered his annual income to establish a Hungarian Academy of Sciences.

1832–36

Antecedents: cholera outbreak in 1831->serf uprising in Upper Hungary

The diet’s lower house accepted the serfs voluntary redemption (the serfs had to pay to their landlords after their services, so they could be free) but the monarch rejected that

Also: new monarch: Ferdinand I of Austria (1835–48)

1839–40

The introduction of the voluntary redemption (no results, the serf’s didn’t have enough money, only 1% of the serfs could free themselves)

Jewish emancipation (free establishment/settlement in the cities, they could join the trade and businesses, the immigration of the Jews began)

1843–44

Hungarian became the official language

Protectionist tariffs-> Védegylet is established (Hungarians will only buy items from Hungary for 6 years)

1847–48 (the last Estates General)

Kossuth became the emissary of Pest

Adoption of the April Laws in March 1848 (sanctioned by the King on 11 April 1848): introduction of a new form of government (constitutional monarchy, accountable government, suffrage); declaration of civil liberties; abolition of the old, feudal social and legal system.

István Széchenyi vs Lajos Kossuth

István Széchenyi 

-moderately conservative

-aristocrat from Vienna

-slow modernisation with the leading role of the aristocrats and maintaining the good relations with the Habsburgs

-no political reforms

-no independent Hungarian industry

-only the agriculture, trade and society should be modernized

-free trade (the abolition of internal tariffs, guilds and monopolies)

Really important figure because he brought modern technology to Hungary such as steamboats (Lake Balaton, Danube), locomotives, horse-breeding, steam mills, Chain Bridge, casinos, river channeling, etc.

Lajos Kossuth 

-main supporters: lesser nobility and bourgeoisie of the cities
	 
-fast and radical reforms (even with revolution)

-liberal

-modernization through rapid industrialization and urbanization

-freedom of serfs (mandatory redemption with state compensation)

-constitutional monarchy

April Laws

References

19th century in Hungary
1820s in the Austrian Empire
1830s in the Austrian Empire
1840s in Hungary